Heinrich Harries (9 September 1762, Flensburg – 28 September 1802) was a German Protestant pastor from the Duchy of Schleswig, then under Danish sovereignty.

Harries wrote the lyrics for "Heil dir im Siegerkranz" for King Christian VII of Denmark in 1790; the song was later adapted to be the unofficial national anthem of the German Empire.

Harries was born in Flensburg and died in Brügge in Schleswig-Holstein.

His great-grandson was the German chemist Carl Harries.

References 
 

People from Flensburg
German Protestant clergy
German lyricists
People from the Duchy of Schleswig
Danish people of German descent
German male writers
1762 births
1802 deaths